Sahab may refer to:
  
Sahab district, a district of Amman, the capital of Jordan
Sahab Geographic and Drafting Institute, a geographical and cartographical institute in Iran
Sahib, an honorific
As-Sahab, the media production house of al-Qaeda
Selim Sahab (born 1941), contemporary conductor and composer
Sahaba or Companions of the Prophet, companions of the prophet Muhammad
Sipah-e-Sahaba Pakistan, Islamist sectarian organization in Pakistan